Shatayu Samman is an award given to persons who lived for a century, by the Government of Madhya Pradesh, India. This award is being given to encourage consciousness about health.

Recipients

Parasram Gurjar (10 October 1886 – 10 December, 2011) He was awarded Shatayu Samman on 1 October, 2011 on World Elders' Day.

See also
  Centenarian
  Supercentenarian

References

Indian centenarians